Paolo Bossoni (born 2 July 1976 in San Secondo Parmense) is an Italian professional road bicycle racer.

Doping
Bossoni tested positive for EPO at the 2008 Italian cycling championships and was subsequently handed a two-year ban from sport.

Major results

 2nd, National Road Race Championship (2007)
 3rd (2004)
 Trofeo Citta' di Castelfidardo (2006)
 Coppa Sabatini (2003)
 Gran Premio Industria e Commercio Artigianato Carnaghese (2002)
 Giro del Lago Maggiore (2001)
 Brixia Tour - 1 stage (2001)
 2000 Vuelta a España - 1 stage

References

External links 
Profile at Lampre-Fondital official website

1976 births
Living people
Italian male cyclists
Italian Vuelta a España stage winners
Doping cases in cycling
Italian sportspeople in doping cases
Sportspeople from the Province of Parma
Cyclists from Emilia-Romagna